The teams event of the 2018 BWF World Junior Championships was held on 5–10 November 2018. The event also known as the 2018 Suhandinata Cup. China was the champion of the last edition held in Yogyakarta, Indonesia, and also 12-time defending champion in this event.

41 countries representing all five continental federations competed in this event. The group draw was done at the BWF Head Office, Kuala Lumpur, on 26 September. China were drawn with Australia and Germany in group A1. Canada as the host were drawn with Malaysia, Ukraine, Poland and Sweden in group B. Algeria and Dominican Republic withdrew before the start of the championships.

Group stage

Group A

Group A1

Group A2

Group A play-offs

Group B

Group C

Group D

Group E

Group F

Group G

Group H

Final stage

1st to 8th

1st to 8th quarterfinals

5th to 8th semifinals

7th-8th place match

5th-6th place match

1st to 4th semifinals

Final

9th to 16th

17th to 24th

25th to 32nd

33rd to 39th

Final standings

References

External links
 Tournament draw
 Official website 

2018 BWF World Junior Championships
World Junior